Balș is a town in Olt County, Oltenia, Romania. The town administers three villages: Corbeni, Româna, and Teiș.

Geography
The town is situated on the Wallachian Plain and lies on the banks of the river Olteț.

Etymology
There are three hypotheses about the town's name:
 The locality was named after the Balșița brook.
 The name comes from the Turkish word "Baliş" (honey), as there is a large apiculture area there.
 A boyar named Balș settled here in the 5th or 6th century.

Population
 1864 - 1,700 inhabitants.
 1884 - 2,500 inhabitants.
 1921 - 5,000 inhabitants.
 1938 - 5,300 inhabitants.
 1948 - 6,128 inhabitants.
 1973 - 11,578 inhabitants.
 1992 - 24,560 inhabitants.
 2002 - 21,195 inhabitants.

The composition from the last census, sorted by nationality:
 * 20,552 Romanians
 * 619 Romani
 * 27 others

The composition from the last census, sorted by religion:
 * 21,043 Eastern Orthodox
 * 47 Seventh-Day Adventists
 * 36 Baptists
 * 19 Pentecostalists
 * 8 Roman-Catholics
 * 5 Atheists
 * 32 other religion

History
 1450 - The estimated date when Balș was established.
 1564 - First mention of Balș in a document

Natives
 Nicușor Bănică
 Eugen Căpățână
 Claudia Constantinescu
 Ion Dumitra
 Cerasela Pătrașcu
 Daniel Stana

References

Towns in Romania
Populated places in Olt County
Localities in Oltenia
Monotowns in Romania